Lisgar—Marquette was a federal electoral district in the province of Manitoba, Canada, that was represented in the House of Commons of Canada from 1988 to 1997.

This riding was created in 1987 from parts of Lisgar and Portage—Marquette ridings.

Lisgar—Marquette consisted of an area bordering on the City of Brandon, Manitoba.

The electoral district was abolished in 1996 when it was redistributed between Brandon—Souris, Dauphin—Swan River and Portage—Lisgar ridings.

Electoral history

|-

 
|Liberal
|Gerry J.E. Gebler
|align="right"|6,133
|align="right"|17.81%
|align="right"|
|align="right"|$44,267

|Progressive Conservative
|Morley McDonald
|align="right"|5,339
|align="right"|15.51%
|align="right"|
|align="right"|$16,872

|No affiliation
||Jake Hoeppner
|align="right"|3,558
|align="right"|10.33%
|align="right"|
|align="right"|$40,395
 
|New Democratic Party
|Diane Beresford
|align="right"|2,073
|align="right"|6.02%
|align="right"|
|align="right"|$3,880
|- bgcolor="white"
!align="right" colspan=3|Total valid votes
!align="right"|34,421
!align="right"|100.00%
!align="right"|
|- bgcolor="white"
!align="right" colspan=3|Total rejected ballots
!align="right"|101
!align="right"|0.29%
!align="right"|
|- bgcolor="white"
!align="right" colspan=3|Turnout
!align="right"|34,522
!align="right"|61.56%
!align="right"|

See also 

 List of Canadian federal electoral districts
 Past Canadian electoral districts

External links
 

Former federal electoral districts of Manitoba